Veliko Lipje is a village in the Municipality of Žužemberk in southeastern Slovenia. The area is part of the historical region of Lower Carniola. The municipality is now included in the Southeast Slovenia Statistical Region.

Name
The name Veliko Lipje literally means 'big Lipje' (in contrast to the neighboring village of Malo Lipje 'little Lipje'). The name is derived from a demonym (originally plural, *Lipľane 'residents of Lipa'), ultimately from the common noun lipa 'linden', referring to the local vegetation.

Church

The local church is dedicated to Saint Martin and belongs to the Parish of Hinje. It is a 14th-century building that was restyled in the Baroque in the second half of the 17th century.

References

External links

Veliko Lipje at Geopedia

Populated places in the Municipality of Žužemberk